The Arab-Israeli Wars, subtitled "Tank Battles in the Mideast 1956–73", is a board wargame published by Avalon Hill in 1977 that simulates various battles during the Suez Crisis, Six-Day War and Yom Kippur War.

Description
Arab-Israeli Wars is a 2-player tactical level wargame that uses a variation of the rules from Avalon Hill's previously published PanzerBlitz (1970).

Components
The game box includes:
20-page rulebook
scenario sheet
225 die-cut counters
four 8" x 17" mounted geomorphic hex grid maps scaled at 250 m (275 yd) per hex including a "Canal" map for scenarios fought along the Suez Canal

Gameplay
The game system uses a standard "I go, You go" alternating sequence of play: one player moves their units and fires, and then the other player does the same, completing one turn.

Scenarios
The game has twenty-four scenarios. Most of them based on historical battles, but one examines what might have happened if certain factors in a particular battle were changed,. and two are hypothetical future battles. The scenarios are presented in increasing order of complexity, so that those new to the game can learn a few rules at a time as they play each scenario.

Publication history
Avalon Hill published the highly successful PanzerBlitz in 1970, a tactical simulation of tank warfare during World War II. This was followed by another World War II simulation, Panzer Leader, in 1974. To update the rules for the faster tanks, guided missiles, and modern aircraft of the 1960s and 1970s, Russell Vane and Seth Carus revised and expanded the PanzerBlitz rules, resulting in The Arab-Israeli Wars, which was published by Avalon Hill in 1977 with artwork by Randall C. Reed.

Reception
In his 1977 book The Comprehensive Guide to Board Wargaming, Nicholas Palmer approvingly noted the inclusion of "all the modern weaponry available in the Middle East."

In Issue 55 of Moves, Ian Chadwick called it "an easy, fun game to learn and play, presented to players in formats of increasing complexity and heightened realism." He concluded by grading the game A for playability, C for component quality and C for historical accuracy, saying, "Gamers new to the system will find it a full, varied course offering many hours of enjoyable gaming, but those of us more used to playing PanzerBlitz and Leader may not be so enthralled with the system."

In Issue 13 of The Journal of 20th Century Wargaming, Marion Bates pointed out that the PanzerBlitz system developed in 1970 was already out of date by the Yom Kippur War of 1973, saying, "The state of the art had simply moved on. The Arab-Israeli system, refurbished with some rudimentary morale rules, teaches little about modern combat." Bate concluded the game was too far out of date to be useful, writing, "The title is mostly balanced and provides some entertaining gaming, but offers little in the way of simulation. Stick to backgammon."

In the 1980 book The Complete Book of Wargames, game designer Jon Freeman thought "while if in not in some ways as successful or as satisfying as its preeminent forefather [PanzerBlitz], The Arab-Israeli Wars is nonetheless a good tactical game." Freeman also thought the game system was outdated, saying, "The main problem is that the system is becoming a little tired, and players may feel they are just getting some new scenarios for an old game." He also noted that "While some of these scenarios are exciting, many are dull and unwieldy." Although he concluded by giving the game an Overall Evaluation of "Good", he recommended that players instead try October War by Simulations Publications Inc. as "more accurate and innovative."

In The Guide to Simulations/Games for Education and Training, Martin Campion discussed how to use the game in a classroom setting, and suggested "a chain of command system can be used. The commander-in-chief on each side should be provided with a separate map and not allowed to look at the actual playing field. Moves on each side should be timed, and players on one side should not be allowed to view the board while the other side is moving."

Other reviews and commentary
Campaign #80
Strategy & Tactics #61
Fire & Movement #8
Perfidious Albion #21

References

Avalon Hill games
Board games about history
Board games introduced in 1977
Board wargames set in Modern history
Mass media about the Arab–Israeli conflict
Tactical wargames
Wargames introduced in 1977